Lomatium brandegeei, also known as Brandegee's desert-parsley is a perennial herb of the family Apiaceae that grows in northern Washington and into British Columbia. Compound umbels with yellow flowers appear from May to June. It has a relatively short taproot, and its stems are 20–60 cm tall.

External links
Lomatium brandegeei

brandegeei
Flora of British Columbia
Flora of Washington (state)
Taxa named by John Merle Coulter
Flora without expected TNC conservation status